Kłoski-Świgonie  is a village in the administrative district of Gmina Kobylin-Borzymy, within Wysokie Mazowieckie County, Podlaskie Voivodeship, in north-eastern Poland.

In the years 1975–1998, the town administratively belonged to the Łomża Province.

References

See also
 Kłoski-Młynowięta

Villages in Wysokie Mazowieckie County